Discretion has the meaning of acting on one's own authority and judgment. In law,  discretion as to legal rulings, such as whether evidence is excluded at a trial, may be exercised by a judge. Some view discretion negatively, while some view it positively. Discretion exists at all levels of law enforcement and in many types of front-line bureaucrats. Discretion has been called "the Art of suiting the action to particular circumstances" (Lord Scarman). Those in a position of power are most often able to exercise discretion as to how they will apply or exercise that power. The ability to make decisions which represent a responsible choice and for which an understanding of what is lawful, right or wise may be presupposed.

In law

In the legal system, discretion is often defined as the ability of a judge to choose where, how and with what severity to sentence a person who has been convicted. A person chooses to utilize his or her options and decides which to use, whether this is a police officer arresting a person on the street (criminal) or evicting someone from an apartment (civil) or anywhere in between. There are some arguments that implementing discretion overrules or weakens the rule of law. However, laws cannot be written without using discretion and therefore the rule of law serves to guide discretion towards societal expectations, norms and, at least in part, public interest.

Criminal
The term crime is defined as an action that is by law, banned or restricted and enforced via Punishment. But, where law ends and discretion begins lies in implementing those laws. The enforcers, police officers, are tasked with enforcing these regulations, but they often have the discretion of when to file charges and arrest. For example, a traffic violation; the police officer may simply issue a warning. In fact, discretion can be found in all stages of the criminal justice system. The victim, has the discretion to use self defense and to report the crime given the opportunity. The Dispatch officer decides the priority of the call, an officer responding has discretion to take statements from witnesses as well as detain potential suspects. The suspect/the accused has the discretion to obtain a lawyer, how they will plead and to accept a plea bargain. The prosecutor in their discretion may choose to prosecute a case or drop the charges as well as suggesting plea bargains. The judge has discretion every time an objection is raised or evidence is given. The jury has discretion over the final verdict. These examples are only a small cross section of the chain of choices that is criminal law.

Environmental 
One article shows that when officers respond to a call for service, if an area has a high rate of Black or wealthy citizens, then it significantly affects the officers' decision to downgrade a crime or incident reported. Officers' experience in different surroundings affect the way they react to service calls. The economic status, poverty level, race and ethnicity influence the officer and how they see and react to their surroundings. Scholar Michael Banton stated that "In different neighborhoods, police provide different services". This is a good example of how and why police are able to use discretion in the performance of their duties. Different environments and neighborhoods provide different levels of dangers and greater levels of crime taking place than others. Which is why an officer might choose to downgrade a crime in a wealthy neighborhood compared to an economically unstable one. The article also states that merely being in a different environment from the one the officer lives in or is accustomed to forces the officer to treat it differently. 

Thus, the officer would then treat the individuals differently. This can be an argument either for or against police using discretion. On the one hand, all people should be treated equally regardless of race or economic status. On the other hand, officer and public safety are the most important duties for an officer. If an officer can recognize that a certain area requires a different approach in order to keep that safety, they should use that discretion appropriately.

Civil
In civil actions, judges and juries are also deemed to have discretion in the matter of damages. Judges also have discretion in the grant or denial of certain motions, e.g. a motion for a continuance.

Criminal 
Prosecutors have a huge discretional role in the criminal justice process. They have the ability to initiate and terminate all criminal prosecutions. They have to use discretion to weigh the rights of the accused, the feelings of the victim, and the capacity of prisons when determining a proper punishment. Prosecutors control plea bargains and thus have possibly the most discretion-based role in the criminal justice process. If they believe a person deserves to be in prison, they will pursue that route, knowing that the prisons are very full and would then lead to a person being released early without serving his full sentence.

Abuse

The exercise of discretion by judges is an inherent aspect of judicial independence under the doctrine of the separation of powers. The standard of review applied to appeals from decisions involving the exercise of judicial discretion is "abuse of discretion."

"An abuse of discretion is a failure to take into proper consideration the facts and law relating to a particular matter; an arbitrary or unreasonable departure from precedent and settled judicial custom." On appeal of an exercise of judicial discretion, "abuse of discretion" is a standard of review requiring the appellate court to find that the lower court's decision would "shock the conscience" of a reasonable person in order to reverse the decision below.

Positive use
Studies show that police officers use discretion to simplify their very complex job requirements and also to identify certain individual priorities, as each officer has to apply the very broad and often contradictory laws put into place by statutes and policymakers. If officers had to cite or make an arrest on every law being broken, we would need a police officer for every 2-3 citizens. We leave it up to the individual officer to use discretion in cases where a gray area resides. Should an officer ticket every person that speeds? Where do they draw the line? This is one of many situations where discretion comes into place.

Not all discretionary usage by law enforcement is negative. They often use it so that they can simplify and weed out the true criminals from the average citizen.

Discretion is the better part of valor
"Discretion is the better part of valor" is an idiom which is generally understood to mean the avoidance of problems or unnecessary risks by thinking carefully and exercising caution before taking action.

The phrase is also found in Act V, Scene IV of the Shakespearean play Henry IV, Part 1, spoken by Falstaff to Prince Hal when the latter has mistaken the former for dead. Falstaff, who had been playing dead on the battlefield to avoid being killed, tells Hal, "The better part of valour is discretion; in the which better part I have saved my life."

Other contexts
The term often comes as part of "Viewer Discretion Is Advised" warning on TV shows before the show begins. In this context, VDA implies the show's content may not be suitable for younger viewers; that is, too explicit in terms of nudity, violence, sexual content, or language. From the book of Proverbs "As a jewel of gold in a swine's snout, so is a fair woman which is without discretion."

References

Criminal law
Criminal justice ethics
Public administration
Administrative law